Asteropseidae is a family of sea stars. Members of the family have relatively broad discs and five short tapering arms.

Genera
The following genera are listed in the World Register of Marine Species:
Asteropsis Müller & Troschel, 1840
Dermasterias Perrier, 1875
Petricia Gray, 1847
Poraniella Verrill, 1914
Valvaster Perrier, 1875

Gallery

References

 
Echinoderm families